The Khabur River is the largest perennial tributary to the Euphrates in Syria. Although the Khabur originates in Turkey, the karstic springs around Ras al-Ayn are the river's main source of water. Several important wadis join the Khabur north of Al-Hasakah, together creating what is known as the Khabur Triangle, or Upper Khabur area. From north to south, annual rainfall in the Khabur basin decreases from over 400 mm to less than 200 mm, making the river a vital water source for agriculture throughout history. The Khabur joins the Euphrates near the town of Busayrah.

Geography
The course of the Khabur can be divided in two distinct zones: the Upper Khabur area or Khabur Triangle north of Al-Hasakah, and the Middle and Lower Khabur between Al-Hasakah and Busayrah.

Tributaries
The tributaries to the Khabur are listed from east to west. Most of these wadis only carry water for part of the year.
Wadi Radd
Wadi Khnezir
Wadi Jarrah
Jaghjagh River
Wadi Khanzir
Wadi Avedji

History
The river was well noted by ancient writers, with various names used by various writers: Ptolemy and Pliny the Elder called it the Chaboras,<ref name=Chaboras>Ptolemy, The Geography, 5.18.3; Pliny the Elder, Natural History, 30.3.</ref> Procopius called it the Chabura, Strabo, Zosimus, and Ammianus Marcellinus called it the Aborrhas (Ἀβόρρας), and Isidore of Charax called it the Aburas (Ἀβούρας). Procopius speaks of it as a river of importance, and Ammianus states that Julian the Apostate crossed it "per navalem Aborae pontem". Strabo describes it as near the town of Anthemusia.

The river is fed by several smaller streams, the names of which are mentioned in the later classical writers. These are, the Scirtus (Procop. de Aedif. 2.7), the Cordes (Procop. de Aedif. 2.2), and the Mygdonius (Julian. Or. i.).

Ptolemy (5.18.6) mentions a town called Chabora (Χαβώρα), on the Euphrates, which he places near Nicephorion, and which probably derives its name from the river, and Theophylact Simocatta mentions Ἀβορέων φρούριον, which is, as certainly, the same place.

Since the 1930s, numerous archaeological excavations and surveys have been carried out in the Khabur Valley, indicating that the region has been occupied since the Lower Palaeolithic period. Important sites that have been excavated include Tell Halaf, Tell Brak, Tell Leilan, Tell Mashnaqa, Tell Mozan and Tell Barri. The region has given its name to a distinctive painted ware found in northern Mesopotamia and Syria in the early 2nd millennium BCE, called Khabur ware. The region of the Khabur River is also associated with the rise of the Kingdom of the Mitanni that flourished c. 1500–1300 BC.

The Khabur River is mentioned in the Hebrew Bible: "Tiglath-Pileser ... took the Reubenites, the Gadites and the half tribe of Manasseh into exile.  He took them to Halah, Habor (Khabur), Hara and the River Gozan, where they are to this day". The identification of the Khabur with the Habor is not contested.

The ancient city of Corsote, visited by Cyrus the Younger on his ill-fated expedition against the Persians as told by Xenophon, was located at the confluence of the Khabur River, known by them as the 'Mascas', and the Euphrates according to Robin Waterfield. Other authors have been circumspect upon the precise location of Corsote due to the changing names and courses of the rivers since that time.

The Khabur river was sometimes identified with the Chebar or Kebar, the location of Tel Abib and setting of several important scenes of the Book of Ezekiel. However, recent scholarship identifies the Chebar as the ka-ba-ru'' waterway mentioned among the 5th century BCE Murushu archives from Nippur, close to Nippur and the Shatt el-Nil, a silted up canal toward the east of Babylon.

Modern Khabur River Valley

The Khabur River Project, begun in the 1960s, involved the construction of a series of dams and canals. Three dams were built in the Khabur Basin as part of a large irrigation scheme that also includes the Tabqa Dam on the Euphrates. The section of the Khabur River within Tell Tamer Subdistrict are home to a self-governing Assyrian enclave. Two dams, Hasakah West and Hasakah East, have been constructed on tributaries to the Khabur between Ra's al-'Ayn and Al-Hasakah. The capacity of the reservoir of Hasakah West is 0.09 km3, and is also the southeastern end of the Assyrian enclave. The capacity of Hasakah East is 0.2 km3. A third dam, Hassakeh South, was constructed on the Khabur 25 km south of Al-Hasakah. The reservoir of this dam has a capacity of 0.7 km3. The Khabur Valley, which now has about four million acres (16,000 km²) of farmland, is Syria's main wheat-cultivation area. The northeastern part is also the center for Syria's oil production.

References

 
Rivers of Turkey
Rivers of Syria
International rivers of Asia
Euphrates
Tur Abdin
Upper Mesopotamia
Landforms of Şanlıurfa Province
Geography of Turkish Kurdistan
Levant
Eastern Mediterranean
New Testament places